The Joint Staff Department of the Central Military Commission (JSDCMC) is the command organ and the headquarters for the People's Liberation Army (PLA), superseding the former PLA General Staff Department (GSD). It was established on 11 January 2016, under the military reforms of Central Military Commission (CMC) chairman Xi Jinping.

Headquartered in Beijing, the Joint Staff Department (JSD) is under the absolute leadership of the CMC and likely serves as an institutional link between members of the CMC and post-2016 PLA theater commands. According to the JSD, its main duties include carrying out combat support planning and combat command support, studying and formulating military strategy and requirements, organizing combat capability assessment, arranging and instructing joint training; and combat readiness and routine war preparedness work.

Organization 
Prior to the 2016 transition, the General Staff Department comprised the following bureaus:

 Combat Operations Command
 Combat Communications
 Intelligence
 Mobilization
 Electronic Warfare
 Foreign Relations
 Management

Within the present Joint Staff Department are the following bureaus:

 General Office (办公厅)
 Guard Bureau (警卫局)
 Political Work Bureau (政治工作局)
 Operations Bureau (作战局)
 Strategic Campaign Training Bureau (战略战役训练局)
 Intelligence Bureau (情报局)
 Navigation Bureau (导航局)
 Information and Communications Bureau (信息通信局)
 Battlefield Environmental Protection Bureau (战场环境保障局)
 Military Requirements Bureau (军事需求局)
The Intelligence Bureau of the Joint Staff Department, formerly the 2nd Bureau or '2PLA' under the GSD, is the most well-known bureau subordinate to the JSD for its role in espionage.

List of Chiefs 
Since 2022, the Chief of Joint Staff Department is General Liu Zhenli. The current deputy chiefs are Lieutenant General Ma Yiming, and Major General Shao Yuanming. Prior to the 2016 rename, department heads were referred to as Chief of the General Staff Department.

|- style="text-align:center;"
|colspan=7|Vacant  1971–75
|-

|- style="text-align:center;"
|colspan=7|General Staff Department is renamed to Joint Staff Department
|-

References

See also 

 Joint Staff Department of the Central Military Commission Intelligence Bureau
 Central Military Commission (China)

Central Military Commission (China)
People's Liberation Army General Staff
2016 establishments in China
Staff (military)
Military units and formations established in 2016
2016 in military history

mt:Dipartiment tal-Persunal Konġunt tal-Kummissjoni Militari Ċentrali